Stenomarconia is a genus of air-breathing land snails, terrestrial pulmonate gastropod mollusks in the family Streptaxidae.

Distribution 
The distribution of the genus Stenomarconia includes:
 Tanzania
 Kenya

Species
Species within the genus Stenomarconia include:

References

Streptaxidae